This is a list of the butterflies of family Nymphalidae which are found in Sri Lanka. It is part of List of the butterflies of Sri Lanka.

Subfamily Danainae

Genus Parantica – glassy tigers

Genus Tirumala – blue tigers

Genus Danaus – tigers

Genus Euploea – crows

Genus Idea – tree nymphs

Subfamily Satyrinae

Genus Melanitis – evening browns

Genus Elymnias – palmflies

Genus Lethe – treebrowns

Genus Mycalesis – bushbrowns

Genus Orsotriaena – nigger

Genus Ypthima – rings

Subfamily Morphinae

Genus Discophora – duffers

Subfamily Biblidinae

Genus Ariadne – castors

Genus Byblia – joker

Subfamily Heliconiinae

Genus Acraea – costers

Genus  Argynnis – fritillaries

Genus Phalanta – leopards

Genus Cethosia – lacewings

Genus Cupha – rustic

Genus Vindula – cruiser

Genus Cirrochroa – yeomans

Subfamily Nymphalinae

Genus  Kaniska – tortoiseshells

Genus  Vanessa – red admirals

Genus Junonia – pansies

Genus Kallima – oakleafs

Genus Doleschallia – autumn leaf

Genus Hypolimnas – eggflies

Subfamily Limenitidinae

Genus Neptis – sailers

Genus Lasippa – lascars

Genus Moduza – commander

Genus Parthenos – clipper

Genus Dophla – redspot duke

Genus Euthalia – barons

Subfamily Apaturinae

Genus Rohana – princes

Subfamily Charaxinae

Genus Polyura – nawabs

Genus Charaxes – rajahs

Subfamily Libytheinae

Genus Libythea – beaks or snouts

References
Bernard d'Abrera, 1983. Butterflies of the Oriental Region, Part II: Nymphalidae, Satyridae, Amathusidae. 290 pp. Hill House, Melbourne. 
D’Abrera, B.L. (1998) The Butterflies of Ceylon. Hill House: Melbourne; London. 224pp. 

Lists of butterflies of Sri Lanka
Nymphalidae